James Howard Holmes (born April 1, 1943, Springfield, Virginia) is an American diplomat. He is the second son of the Rev. Robert Usher and Bertha Jeannette Cook Holmes.  He is a 1965 graduate of Colgate University, as well as, a graduate of Johns Hopkins University School of Advanced International Studies, and the National War College.  He joined the Foreign Service in 1967 and has served overseas in Pakistan, New Zealand, Norway, and Latvia.  He is married and has two daughters and five grandchildren.

Foreign Service Career

1984-1988  Director of the Office of Strategic Nuclear Policy in the Bureau of Political-Military Affairs.
1988-1992  Deputy Director of the Department of State's Policy Planning Staff with responsibilities for European policy.
1992-1995  Deputy Chief of Mission in the U.S. Embassy in Ankara, Turkey.
1995-1998  President's Coordinator for Assistance to Central and Eastern Europe responsible for assistance programs to fourteen Central European states, including start-up of the economic and reconstruction programs in Bosnia and Croatia.
1998-2001  U.S. Ambassador to Latvia.
2002–present  Special Advisor for Southeast Europe in the Bureau of European and Eurasian Affairs at the Department of State.
2004-2014 President of the American-Turkish Council.

External links
 State Department profile

References

Lillian Dillenbeck Tallman, editor. The Dallenbachs in America, 1935-1979. Mohawk Valley Printing Company, Herkimer, New York, 1979. pp. 36, 46.

1943 births
Living people
Colgate University alumni
Paul H. Nitze School of Advanced International Studies alumni
Ambassadors of the United States to Latvia
American expatriates in Pakistan
United States Foreign Service personnel